This is a list of FM radio stations in the United States having call signs beginning with the letters WQ through WS. Low-power FM radio stations, those with designations such as WQAR-LP, have not been included in this list.

WQ

WR

WS

See also
 North American call sign

Lists of radio stations in the United States